A digital assistant may refer to:
 Personal digital assistant (PDA), a small battery-powered and very pocketable computer for personal organizational or recreational purposes 
 Enterprise digital assistant (EDA), a small battery-powered and very pocketable computer for business or industrial use
 An embodied agent of artificial intelligence
 Virtual assistants, software agents that can perform certain tasks based on voice commands